City Harvest is one of New York City's largest food rescue organizations. The organization collects food waste from restaurants, bakeries, and cafes.

History 

City Harvest was founded in 1982 and is the world's first food rescue organization. The organization collects excess food from restaurants, grocers, bakeries, Green markets, corporate cafeterias, manufacturers, and farms. The food is then delivered to community food programs throughout New York City. Food delivered by City Harvest is received by approximately 1 million residents.

Its founders included Helen verDuin Palit, Harley Brooke-Hitching, and Peter Schmidt. The operation relies on the services of roughly 160 employees and 20,000 volunteers annually. Fresh fruits and vegetables form more than half of the rescued food.

In 2005, City Harvest began holding two free farmers' market-style distributions in low-income communities each month. The operation now includes nine Mobile Markets – two per borough – each month, distributing approximately three million pounds of fresh produce a year. In 2013, these markets delivered around one million pounds of produce to 50,000 residents.

In December 2011, City Harvest opened its 45,400 square foot Food Rescue Facility in Long Island City, Queens. The facility includes a large cooler and freezer to hold perishable food on a short-term basis and a large dry storage area to sort non-perishable goods.

City Harvest hosts annual events such as the City Harvest Gala, Summer in the City, and BID.

Leadership 
City Harvest’s Food Council has more than 70 members. The current chair of the Food Council is Geoffrey Zakarian. Founding Food Council members include: 

 Éric Ripert 
 Dana Cowin 
 Michael Lomonaco 
 Danny Meyer 
 Drew Nieporent  

The Food Council has since expanded to include: 

 Ron Ben-Israel 
 David Chang 
 Tom Colicchio 
 Marc Murphy 
 Marcus Samuelsson 
 Gail Simmons 
 Jean-Georges Vongerichten
 Eitan Bernath

Programs 

Since 2006, the Healthy Neighborhoods initiative has expanded access to produce and has offered nutrition education to residents. These programs target high-need communities throughout the five boroughs.

Emergency food programs

City Harvest delivers over 10 million pounds of food (60% of which produces) each year to emergency food programs located within designated Healthy Neighborhoods. Soup kitchens and food pantries are then able to offer participants a variety of food. Through the Agency Capacity Expansion (ACE) program, City Harvest offers grants for one-time projects to selected emergency food programs to upgrade facilities and services. In addition, City Harvest University's courses teach agencies core skill sets.

Educational outreach

Developed by Share Our Strength, Cooking Matters workshops educate all age groups on how to develop and maintain a healthy diet. City Harvest teaches customers how to find affordable, healthy foods in their communities.

City Harvest also uses a nutrition education curriculum to work with low-income seniors.

Food accessibility
City Harvest partners with community residents, organizations, after-school programs, and businesses to promote nutritious eating options. City Harvest helps neighborhood retailers increase the quantity, quality, and variety of produce. In addition, City Harvest hosts healthy cooking demonstrations and budget shopping workshops. The efforts seek to improve communication between shop owners and clientele.

To build public support for healthy food outlets and sustain change over time, City Harvest convenes Community Action Networks (CANS) in each of its Healthy Neighborhoods. These networks engage residents and retailers who are committed to improving access to healthy food.

Advocacy 

City Harvest advocates at the city, state, and federal levels for programs, policies, and actions to change the conditions that result in food insecurity and hunger. City Harvest also provides low-income New Yorkers with access to federal nutrition programs and regional food supplies.

Awards and recognition 

In 1989 City Harvest founder Helen verDuin Palit received a presidential citation for a private sector initiative from President George H. W. Bush as part of his 1,000 Points of Light program.

In 2008, Charity Navigator awarded City Harvest with 4 stars in their charity ranking system. The Robin Hood Foundation awarded a $400,000 grant to City Harvest in 2009 based on the efficiency of City Harvest’s unique food rescue model.

The following year Executive Director Jilly Stephens was honored at the Annual Spirit of ABNY (Association for a Better New York) awards as a select New Yorker who has provided a distinguished level of service to New York City.

In The New York Times Company’s annual Nonprofit Excellence Awards, City Harvest was awarded the Silver Prize for Excellent Management in 2011.

See also

 List of food banks

References 

1982 establishments in New York City
Charities based in New York City
Food banks in New York (state)
Hunger relief organizations
Non-profit organizations based in New York City
Organizations established in 1982